Anil Deshpande (born 2 August 1952) is an Indian former first-class cricketer who played for Vidarbha. He worked as a selector for the Indian team from 1998 to 2000.

Career
Deshpande played as an all-rounder for Vidarbha across 13 seasons. He made 62 first-class appearances, scoring more than 3000 runs and taking 88 wickets. He was a regular member of Central Zone cricket team during his career and made 21 first-class appearances for the team. Although he did not play international matches, Deshpande represented Central Zone against visiting Australian, English, Pakistani, Sri Lankan and West Indies teams in first-class matches.

In 1998, Deshpande became a member of the Indian team selection panel, representing Central Zone. He resigned from the position in 2000, citing personal reasons. Later in his career, he also stood as an umpire in cricket matches.

References

External links 
 
 

1952 births
Living people
Indian cricketers
Vidarbha cricketers
Central Zone cricketers
India national cricket team selectors
Indian cricket umpires